Samuel Lount is a Canadian drama film, released in 1985.

A historical drama set during the Upper Canada Rebellion of 1837, the film stars R. H. Thomson as Samuel Lount, an organizer of the rebellion who was ultimately convicted of treason and executed in 1838.  The film's cast also includes Linda Griffiths as Lount's wife Elizabeth, David Fox as David Willson, Booth Savage as Edward Kennedy, Richard Donat as Samuel Jarvis, Andrew Gillies as Francis Bond Head, Cedric Smith as William Lyon Mackenzie, and Donald Davis as John Strachan.

The film was produced by Elvira Lount, a direct descendant of Samuel's brother, and directed by Laurence Keane. It premiered at the 1985 Toronto International Film Festival, and received a limited further theatrical release before being distributed primarily as a television film on CBC Television in 1986.

The film received five Genie Award nominations at the 7th Genie Awards in 1986, for Best Actor (Thomson), Best Cinematography (Marc Champion), Best Costume Design (Olga Dimitrov), Best Editing (Richard Martin) and Best Sound Editing (Michael O'Farrell). It did not win any of the awards.

Part of it took place in Sharon Temple.

References

External links 
 

1985 films
Films set in 1837
1980s biographical drama films
CBC Television original films
Canadian biographical drama films
Upper Canada Rebellion
Films set in Ontario
Canadian historical drama films
1980s historical drama films
1985 drama films
Canadian films based on actual events
English-language Canadian films
Canadian drama television films
1980s English-language films
1980s Canadian films